Hannu Sulo Salama (born 4 October 1936) is a Finnish author.

Biography and work 
Hannu Salama was born in Kouvola, Kymenlaakso region in Southern Finland. He spent his childhood in the Pispala district of the city of Tampere, in a traditional working-class area with working class politics and culture. Following in the footsteps of his father, Salama first worked as an electrician and a farm hand. Salama's literary debut was called Se tavallinen tarina (The Usual Story) (1961). In 1966 he was convicted for blasphemy for his book Juhannustanssit (Midsummer Dances) from 1964. He was released on probation, but finally pardoned by the Finnish president Urho Kekkonen in 1968. The new editions of the book were published as censored versions up until 1990. Salama has written short stories as well as novels and won many literary awards in Scandinavia.

Despite his working-class background Salama has never admitted to be a working-class novelist. He has maintained his critical autonomy both to the left and to the right. But it has to be said that according to the two main characteristics of the working-class literature and author – a person comes from the working-class and deals with workers' world, its ordinary issues as well as controversies with the elite – he belongs to the long tradition of working-class authors.

Of Salama's books, his Finlandia Series probably enjoys the greatest literary reputation, including among all Kosti Herhiläisen perunkirjoitus, Kolera on raju bändi and Pasi Harvalan tarina I–III. Hannu Salama has also published collections of poetry. In the mid-1990s he wrote three crime novels under the pen name Aki Rautala.

List of works 
 Se tavallinen tarina (1961)
 Juhannustanssit (1964)
 Minä, Olli ja Orvokki (1967)
 Siinä näkijä missä tekijä (1972)
 Näkymä kuivaushuoneen ikkunasta (1988)
 Elämän opetuslapsia IV (2004)

Prizes 
 Eino Leino Prize (1985)
 Aleksis Kivi Prize (1990)

External links 

Hannu Salama. Interview in Tamperelainen from 17 December 2005.
 Salama, Hannu at Uppslagsverket Finland .

References

1936 births
Living people
People from Kouvola
Finnish writers
Writers from Kymenlaakso
Nordic Council Literature Prize winners
People convicted of blasphemy
Recipients of the Eino Leino Prize